Wakame (Undaria pinnatifida) is a species of kelp native to cold, temperate coasts of the northwest Pacific Ocean. As an edible seaweed, it has a subtly sweet, but distinctive and strong flavour and texture. It is most often served in soups and salads.

Wakame has long been collected for food in East Asia, and sea farmers in Japan have cultivated wakame since the eighth century (Nara period). , the Invasive Species Specialist Group has listed the species on its list of 100 worst globally invasive species.

Names
The primary common name is derived from the Japanese name .
In English, it can be also called sea mustard.
In Chinese, it is called  (裙带菜).
In Korean, it is called  (미역).

Etymology
In Old Japanese,  stood for edible seaweeds in general as opposed to  standing for algae. Among seaweeds, wakame was likely most often eaten, therefore  especially meant wakame. It expanded later to other seaweeds like kajime, hirome (kombu), arame, etc. Wakame is derived from  +  (lit. 'young seaweed'). Besides,  (lit.

History in the West
The earliest appearance in Western documents is probably in Nippo Jisho (1603), as Vacame.

In 1867 the word wakame appeared in an English-language publication, A Japanese and English Dictionary, by James C. Hepburn.

Starting in the 1960s, the word wakame started to be used widely in the United States, and the product (imported in dried form from Japan) became widely available at natural food stores and Asian-American grocery stores, due to the influence of the macrobiotic movement, and in the 1970s with the growing number of Japanese restaurants and sushi bars.

Health
Studies conducted at Hokkaido University have found that a compound in wakame known as fucoxanthin can help burn fatty tissue. Studies in mice have shown that fucoxanthin induces expression of the fat-burning protein UCP1 that accumulates in fat tissue around the internal organs.  Expression of UCP1 protein was significantly increased in mice fed fucoxanthin.
Wakame is also used in topical beauty treatments.
See also Fucoidan.

Wakame is a rich source of eicosapentaenoic acid, an omega-3 fatty acid. At over 400 mg/(100 kcal) or almost 1 mg/kJ, it has one of the higher nutrient-to-energy ratios for this nutrient, and among the very highest for a vegetarian source. Wakame also has high levels of sodium, calcium, iodine, thiamine and niacin.

In Oriental medicine it has been used for blood purification, intestinal strength, skin, hair, reproductive organs and menstrual regularity.

In Korea, the soup miyeokguk is popularly consumed by women after giving birth as sea mustard contains a high content of calcium and iodine, nutrients that are important for new nursing mothers. Many women consume it during the pregnancy phase as well. It is also traditionally eaten on birthdays for this reason, a reminder of the first food that the mother has eaten and passed on to her newborn through her milk.

Aquaculture
Japanese and Korean sea-farmers have grown wakame for centuries, and are still both the leading producers and consumers. Wakame has also been cultivated in France since 1983, in sea fields established near the shores of Brittany.

Wild-grown wakame is harvested in Tasmania, Australia, and then sold in restaurants in Sydney and also sustainably hand-harvested from the waters of Foveaux Strait in Southland, New Zealand and freeze-dried for retail and use in a range of products.

Cuisine
Wakame fronds are green and have a subtly sweet flavour and satiny texture. The leaves should be cut into small pieces as they will expand during cooking.

In Japan and Europe, wakame is distributed either dried or salted, and used in soups (particularly miso soup), and salads (tofu salad), or often simply as a side dish to tofu and a salad vegetable like cucumber. These dishes are typically dressed with soy sauce and vinegar/rice vinegar.

Goma wakame, also known as seaweed salad, is a popular side dish at American and European sushi restaurants. Literally translated, it means 'sesame seaweed', as sesame seeds are usually included in the recipe.

Invasive species

Native to cold temperate coastal areas of Japan, Korea, China, and Russia, in recent decades it has become established in temperate regions around the world, including New Zealand, the United States, Belgium, France, Great Britain, Spain, Italy, Argentina, Australia and Mexico. It was nominated one of the 100 worst invasive species in the world. Undaria is commonly initially introduced or recorded on artificial structures, where its r-selected growth strategy facilitates proliferation and spread to natural reef sites. Undaria populations make a significant but inconsistent contribution of food and habitat to intertidal and subtidal reefs. Undaria invasion can cause changes to native community composition at all trophic levels. As well as increasing primary productivity, it can reduce the abundance and diversity of understory algal assemblages, out-compete some native macroalgal species and affect the abundance and composition of associated epibionts and macrofauna: including gastropods, crabs, urchins and fish.

New Zealand
In New Zealand, Undaria pinnatifida was declared as an unwanted organism in 2000 under the Biosecurity Act 1993. It was first discovered in Wellington Harbour in 1987 and probably arrived as hull fouling on shipping or fishing vessels from Asia.

Wakame is now found around much of New Zealand, from Stewart Island to as far north as the subtropical waters of Karikari Peninsula. It spreads in two ways: naturally, through the millions of microscopic spores released by each fertile organism, and through human mediated spread, most commonly via hull fouling and with marine farming equipment. It is a highly successful and fertile species, which makes it a serious invader. However, its impacts are not well understood and vary depending on the location.

Even though it is an invasive species, in 2012 the government allowed for the farming of wakame in Wellington, Marlborough and Banks Peninsula.

United States
The seaweed has been found in several harbors in southern California. In May 2009 it was discovered in San Francisco Bay and aggressive efforts are underway to remove it before it spreads.

See also
 Kelp
 Kombu
 Laverbread

References

External links 

 Wakame Seaweed at About.com
 AlgaeBase link
 Undaria pinnatifida at the FAO
 Undaria pinnatifida at the Joint Nature Conservation Committee, UK
 Global Invasive species database
 Undaria Management at the Monterey Bay National Marine Sanctuary

Alariaceae
Algae of Korea
Marine biota of Asia
Edible algae
Edible seaweeds
Japanese cuisine terms
Plants described in 1873